or  is a folk faith in Japan with Taoist origins, influenced by Shinto, Buddhism and other local beliefs. A typical event related to the faith is called , held on the Kōshin days that occur every 60 days in accordance with the Chinese sexagenary cycle.

On this day some believers stay awake to prevent , entities believed to live inside the body of believers, from leaving it during that night in order to report the good and specially the bad deeds of the believer to the god Ten-Tei.

It is not clearly certain when such custom arrived or came into fashion in Japan, although it is believed that by some time in the 9th century it had been already practiced at least by aristocrats. A Japanese monk called Ennin wrote in his travel book upon visiting Tang China in 838, that "Tonight people are not sleeping. It is the same as in our country on Kōshin nights." In the Muromachi period, Buddhist monks started to write about the Kōshin, which led to wider popularity of the faith among public. Numerous monuments or pillars called  (or also ) were erected all over the country and the faith remained very popular through the  Edo period. When the Meiji Government issued the Shinto and Buddhism Separation Order in 1872, folk beliefs were turned down as superstitious, Kōshin belief too losing popularity as a result.

Today, the Kōshin belief still survives, although it is far less popular and receives smaller recognition than it once did, due to the absence of any central organization to help promote such faith because of its folkloric nature. While many Kōshin-tō were moved, for example, to inside Buddhist temples or even to private houses to be protected, there are many remaining along historical roads as well. There are also well maintained , built in respect for the Kōshin, sometimes attached to Buddhist temples, or otherwise in stand-alone.

Deities and customs
It is believed that Kōshin belief had arrived in Japan at the latest by the Heian period, and was adopted only by the aristocracy in the beginning. The most ancient custom is that of staying awake one special night every sixty days. It is called Kōshin-Machi (庚申待 - Kōshin Waiting). During the early years this custom became a kind of overnight festivity or party.

The main Kōshin belief that survived from an original complex faith, is the concept that Three Corpses, called Sanshi (三尸), live in everyone's body. The Sanshi keep track of the good deeds and particularly the bad deeds of the person they inhabit. On the night called Kōshin-Machi (which happens each 60 days), while the person sleeps, the Sanshis leave the body and go to Ten-Tei (天帝), the Heavenly god, to report about the deeds of that person. Ten-Tei will then decide to punish bad people, making them ill, shortening their lifetime and in extreme cases putting an end to their lives. Believers of Kōshin will try to live a life without bad deeds, but those who have reason to fear will try to stay awake during Kōshin nights, as the only way to prevent the Sanshi from leaving the body and reporting to Ten-Tei.

In the Edo period, Kōshin-Machi became more popular in other levels of society and with commoners, leading to a proliferation of festivities and cultic activities. Many of these practices convened around the worship of specific deities. These deities were visualized in hanging scrolls, icons, and stone carvings, many of which continue to dot the rural landscape of Japan today. One god of special prominence in the Kōshin cult was Shōmen-Kongō (Blue-Faced Vajra-Yakṣa), a fearsome blue-faced deity with many arms. Shōmen-Kongō's role connections with Kōshin belief and practice can be traced back as early as the late Heian period, if not earlier. The first scriptures that established such connections were significantly produced in the context of esoteric Buddhist rituals centered at Onjōji (a.k.a. Miidera). Another temple crucial in the early development of this cult was Shitennō-ji.

Shōmen-Kongō became Kōshin-san when people expected this deity to make the Sanshis themselves ill and prevent them going to Ten-Tei. 

Three monkeys covering eyes, mouth and ears with their hands are the best known symbols of Kōshin faith. They are Mizaru (not see), Iwazaru (not say) and Kikazaru (not hear). It is not very clear why the three monkeys became part of Kōshin belief, but is assumed that it is because like the monkeys, the Sanshis and Ten-Tei are not to see, hear, or tell the bad deeds of a person.

Statues of Shōmen-Kongō with the three monkeys have existed in temples and shrines since the Edo era. Sometimes carved stones called Kōshin-tō were placed around a dwelling for protection. Such stones can present diverse forms, from having only Chinese characters (kanji) to including a depiction of Shōmen- Kongō with one, two or three monkeys.

Other custom of the Kōshin belief are the use of paper scrolls also showing Kōshin-san and the monkeys which are displayed on Kōshin-machi, the Kōshin night. Those who keep this tradition invite neighbours, friends and relatives and sit in front of a provisory altar which has a bowl of rice, soup, seasonal fruit, flowers, candles and incense sticks. They also hang scrolls with pictures of Shōmen-Kongō. Everyone will try to stay awake through the whole night.

See also
 Yasaka Kōshin-dō

References and further reading

 Emiko Ohnuki-Tierney, The Monkey as Mirror: Symbolic Transformations in Japanese History and Ritual (Asian Studies/Anthropology),  Princeton University Press, 1989, 
 Kubo, Noritada (窪 徳忠) Kōshin Shinkō no Kenkyū: Nitchū Shūkyō Bunka Kōshō-shi (庚申信仰の研究―日中宗教文化交渉史) (Research on Belief in Kōshin - A History of Cultural-Religious Exchange,  Nihon  Gakujutsu  Shinkō-kai, 1961.
 Emiko Ohnuki-Tierney, Illness and Culture in Contemporary Japan: An Anthropological View, Cambridge University Press, 1984, 
 Lafcadio Hearn, Japan's Religions: Shinto and Buddhism, Kessinger Publishing Co, 2003,  
 Ichiro Hori, Folk Religion in Japan: Continuity and Change, University of Chicago Press, 1974, 
 Livia Kohn, Daoism and Chinese Culture, Three Pines Press, 2005, 
 Richard Bowring, The Religious Traditions of Japan,  Cambridge University Press, 2005, 
  Three-Monkeys site with related research and information

External links 
The koshin belief, The Iroha Project

Japanese folk religion